Belinda Balaski (born December 8, 1947 in Inglewood, California) is an American actress. She is perhaps best known for her large supporting role as Terri Fisher in Joe Dante's The Howling (1981), and has continued to appear in most of Dante's films, including Piranha, Gremlins, Gremlins 2: The New Batch, Matinee and Small Soldiers, as well two segments that Dante directed for Amazon Women on the Moon. She also co-starred in The Food of the Gods and Bobbie Jo and the Outlaw, both featuring Marjoe Gortner, and in Cannonball! as a navigator in a cross-country car race.

Among many TV show appearances Belinda performed in two Baywatch episodes - Sharks Cove, 1992 Season 2 as a worried mother and Sail Away, 1996 Season 6 as  Cleo Jennings.

Filmography

Movies

Television

References

External links

1947 births
Living people
Actresses from California
American film actresses
American television actresses
Actresses from Inglewood, California
21st-century American women